Liolaemus scrocchii is a species of lizard in the family Liolaemidae. It is native to Argentina.

References

scrocchii
Reptiles described in 2008
Reptiles of Argentina
Endemic fauna of Argentina
Taxa named by Andrés Sebastián Quinteros
Taxa named by Cristian Simón Abdala